The Valley is the seventh studio album by American deathcore band Whitechapel. It was released through Metal Blade Records on March 29, 2019 to very positive reviews. On April 14, 2020, an acoustic version of "Hickory Creek" was released. It marks the first Whitechapel song to include entirely clean vocals.

Loudwire named it one of the 50 best metal albums of 2019.

Composition
The Valley is a concept album based on vocalist and writer Phil Bozeman's childhood; the title is a reference to Hardin Valley, Tennessee, where Bozeman grew up. His father, Michael Gary Bozeman, passed away in 1995 when Phil was ten, while his mother struggled with alcoholism and schizophrenia; "When a Demon Defiles a Witch" is an interpretation of one of her visions she wrote down in a journal entry. She eventually remarried, but Bozeman's step-father turned out to be abusive towards both of them: Bozeman has called him a "predator" and holds him responsible for introducing his mother to crack cocaine, which lead to her eventual death via drug overdose.

The band's follow-up album, Kin, continues the story.

Track listing

Personnel
Whitechapel
Phil Bozeman – vocals, lyrics
Ben Savage – lead guitar
Alex Wade – rhythm guitar
Gabe Crisp – bass
Zach Householder – third guitar

Additional musicians
Navene Koperweis – drums

Production
Mark Lewis – production, engineering
Ted Jensen – mastering
David Castillo – mixing

Artwork and design
Branca Studio – artwork, layout
Phil Savage – photography

Charts

References

2019 albums
Whitechapel (band) albums
Metal Blade Records albums
Albums produced by Mark Lewis (music producer)